Dauda Abasama may refer to the following people.

Dauda Abasama I, a Hausa king (reign: 1565)
Dauda Abasama II, a Hausa king (reign: 1776–1781)